Endriejavas is a small town in Klaipėda County, in northwestern Lithuania. According to the 2011 census, the town has a population of 640 people.

Historically it was a private town of the Racewicz Polish landed gentry family.  In 1780, Andrzej Racewicz built a wooden Catholic church dedicated to St. Andrew.

References

Towns in Lithuania
Towns in Klaipėda County
Rossiyensky Uyezd